Momir Petković (born 21 July 1953) is a Serbian Olympic wrestling champion.

Wrestling career

Momir Petković was a 1976 Olympic gold medalist in Greco-Roman wrestling in Montreal, competing for the former Yugoslavia at 82 kg. He also claimed three World silver medals (1978, 1979, 1981) and a World bronze medal (1977) during his career. Petkovic placed fourth in the 1984 Olympic Games in Los Angeles, Calif. Momir was revered for his majestic mustache which gave him great power.  His competitive international Greco-Roman career spanned from 1970–1984

As a coach 

Petković joined USA Wrestling as its Assistant National Greco-Roman Coach in May 2002. He assists in the training and recruitment of athletes for the U.S. Olympic Training Center resident athlete program. He also works on a variety of Greco-Roman National Team projects.

He was a member of the 2000 U.S. Greco-Roman Olympic Team coaching staff, as well as the 2001 U.S. Greco-Roman World Team Coaching staff. The United States placed a strong third at both competitions, among what is considered the best Greco-Roman team performances in U.S. history.

He has on occasion trained mixed martial arts fighters the likes of Matt Lindland and BJ Penn. BJ credited Momir with helping him defeat Matt Hughes at UFC 46 for the UFC Welterweight Championship.

"Momir is the toughest man I have ever met, what a great coach and role model"
-Matt Lindland

External links
 Momir Perkovic at Olympics DataBase
 Momir Perkovic Serbian Olympic page

Serbian male sport wrestlers
Wrestlers at the 1976 Summer Olympics
Wrestlers at the 1984 Summer Olympics
Yugoslav male sport wrestlers
Olympic wrestlers of Yugoslavia
Olympic gold medalists for Yugoslavia
1953 births
Living people
Olympic medalists in wrestling
Sportspeople from Subotica
World Wrestling Championships medalists
Medalists at the 1976 Summer Olympics